Clayoquot Plateau Provincial Park is a provincial park in British Columbia, Canada. It is located on the west side of the Kennedy River, to the northeast of the town of Tofino.

The park was established in 1995, comprising .

See also
Clayoquot Arm Provincial Park
Clayoquot Sound

References

External links
BC Parks page "Clayoquot Plateau Park"

Provincial parks of British Columbia
Clayoquot Sound region
1995 establishments in British Columbia
Protected areas established in 1995